is a leading English contract law case on damages for breach of contract. It established that in some circumstances, where ordinary remedies are inadequate, restitutionary damages may be awarded.

Facts
George Blake was a member of the Secret Intelligence Service. He signed a Official Secrets Act 1911 declaration in his employment contract not to disclose information about his work, even after his employment ceased. In 1951, he became a Soviet agent. He was discovered in 1961 and the British government imprisoned him in Wormwood Scrubs (HM Prison). He escaped in 1966 and fled to the Soviet Union. He wrote a book about it and his secret services work called No Other Choice. He received a publishing contract for its release in 1989, with Jonathan Cape Ltd. The information in the book was no longer confidential. Blake received advanced payments and was entitled to more. The Crown brought an action for all the profits he made on the book including those that he had not yet received. It argued a restitutionary principle should apply.

Judgment
Lord Nicholls, Lord Goff of Chieveley, Lord Browne-Wilkinson and Lord Steyn held that in exceptional cases, when the normal remedy is inadequate to compensate for breach of contract, the court can order the defendant to account for all profits. This was an exceptional case in contract law, particularly because Blake had harmed the public interest. In addition to his double agency, publication was a further breach of the confidentiality clause, and disclosure of non-confidential information was a criminal offence under the Official Secrets Act 1911. An absolute rule against disclosure was necessary to ensure that the secret service was able to deal in complete confidence. It was in the Crown's legitimate interest to ensure Blake did not benefit from revealing state information. The House of Lords ruled that normal contractual remedies of damages, specific performance or injunction were not enough, and that the publishers should pay any money owing to Blake to the Crown.

Nicholls' judgment 
In his judgment, Lord Nicholls states that a breach of contract allows for the award of damages "when no financial loss flows from the infringement", comparing the present case to that of a case concerning the duty owed by a trustee or fiduciary. Highlighting the fact that "trustees and fiduciaries are financially disinterested in carrying out their duties... to this end they must not make any unauthorised profit," and that trustees and fiduciaries are accountable for "unauthorised profits", regardless of whether the beneficiaries have made a loss, he compared the current case to Reading v. Attorney General [1951] AC 507, a case that involved a breach concerning another civil servant. Invoking the Chancery Amendment Act 1858, he stated that the court had a jurisdiction to "award damages when declining to grant equitable relief" in equity rather than in common law. Whilst "the common law courts' jurisdiction to award damages was confined to loss of injury flowing from a cause of action which had accrued before the writ was issued", equity allowed for "damages for loss of a bargaining opportunity or... the price payable for the compulsory acquisition of a right."

Outlining the law on remedies for breach, Nicholls states that damages are generally compensatory as per Robinson v Harman. However, damages awarded based on an innocent party's financial loss may not always be "adequate", recognising a party's interest in performance, as in the case of Wrotham Park damages. Whilst the Wrotham Park case concerned strictly property rights, the law had recently been extended to include personal rights in contract as well. Additionally, Nicholls diverged from some cases in allowing for plaintiffs, depending on the situation, to not only recoup profits already made from a breacher of contract but to claim all future profits as well. He states that a breach of confidence is an exceptional situation that allows for an injured party to claim "either compensatory damages or an account of the wrongdoer's profits", that only in similarly exceptional situations where ordinary remedies are inadequate "that any question of accounting for profits will arise", and that the allowing of such claims will require the court to regard:

On policy reasons, Nicholls states that the present case is one where a claim for profits made can be allowed:

Steyn's judgment 
Lord Goff and Lord Browne-Wilkinson agreed. Lord Steyn gave a concurring opinion:

Hobhouse's dissenting judgment 
Lord Hobhouse dissented. He asserted that the Crown had no proprietary right to the money and as such had suffered no loss so as to receive restitutionary damages. Instead, he argued that compensatory damages, not a full account of profit, were appropriate:

See also

Termination and restitution cases
Ruxley Electronics & Construction v Forsyth [1996] AC 344
Experience Hendrix LLC v PPX Enterprises Inc [2003] EWCA Civ 323, [2003] 1 All ER (Comm) 830

Trusts cases
Keech v Sandford (1726) 25 ER 223
Boardman v Phipps, the strict fiduciary duty in English trusts law to have no possibility of a conflict of interest

Notes

References
World Wide Fund for Nature v World Wrestling Federation Entertainment Inc [2007] EWCA Civ 286
Nottingham University v Fischel [2000] EWHC 221 (QB), [2000] IRLR 471, where an employee was held to be under no general fiduciary duty to refrain from undertaking outside private clinic work, but did breach a fiduciary duty where he had directed junior university staff to assist him in that outside work. The latter created a conflict of interest, whereas the former did not since patients would not have used the University's services.
, a senior executive of an American company, Mr Blackman, was held liable to pay heavy compensation for breach of contract for copying the invention of the company when he found it was unpatented in Australia. But, the Australian High Court held Mr Blackman (and his company, Hospital Products Ltd) was not liable to disgorge profits unless some "fiduciary" relationship could be identified. Deane J dissented, holding there could be an account of profits. The dissent was approved by P Birks, 'The Content of Fiduciary Obligation' (2000) 34 Israel Law Review 3, 22
Adras Building Material Ltd v Harlow & Jones GmbH [1995] RLR 235, Israel Supreme Court holds a person liable for account of profits after breach of an employment contract

External links
Full text from Bailii

English contract case law
English remedy case law
House of Lords cases
2000 in case law
2000 in British law